Ann Ollestad (born 3 August 1952) is a Norwegian diplomat and the country's ambassador to Myanmar from 2013 until 2016.

Born in Oslo, she graduated as cand.polit. in 1983. She then mainly worked in the Ministry of Foreign Affairs, including posts in Paris, Bonn and Geneva. 

In 2000, she was appointed deputy under-secretary of State in the Ministry of Foreign Affairs. She held this position until 2007, when she was appointed Norwegian ambassador to India. Before the year ended, her ambassadorship was extended to Bhutan. 

In 2013, she was appointed ambassador of the newly opened Norwegian embassy in Yangon.

References

1952 births
Living people
Ambassadors of Norway to India
Ambassadors of Norway to Bhutan
Diplomats from Oslo
Norwegian women ambassadors
Ambassadors of Norway to Myanmar